Hernándo is a Spanish masculine given name, and may refer to:

 Hernándo Cortés de Monroy Pizarro (1485-1547), Spanish conquistador
 Hernándo Pizarro (circa 1508-1608), Spanish conquistador

See also
 Hernando (disambiguation)

Spanish masculine given names